Wimbledon is a 2004 romantic comedy film directed by Richard Loncraine. The film stars Paul Bettany as a journeyman tennis pro (once ranked 11th) and Kirsten Dunst as an up-and-coming tennis star. Sam Neill and Jon Favreau co-star.

Plot
Peter Colt, a British professional tennis player in his thirties whose ranking has slipped from 11th to 119th in the world, has never really had to fight for anything, as his wealthy family allowed him to easily pursue his tennis ambitions. Though he earns a wildcard spot to the Wimbledon tournament, he feels it's time to admit he's getting too old to compete with fitter up-and-coming younger players and intends, after this last Wimbledon, to take a job with a prestigious tennis club.

As Wimbledon begins, he bumps into Lizzie Bradbury, the American rising star of female tennis. They fall in love and her interest in him changes his entire perception, even giving him the strength to win again. After an unexpected win in the first round, Peter is about to lose his second match but turns it around when he hears Lizzie cheering for him in the crowd. In his third match, he unexpectedly comes up against his training partner and best friend, Dieter Prohl. Peter beats Dieter, who comments that Peter has developed a 'killer instinct', the ability to win the match no matter the cost or the method. Peter's unexpected success makes him a sensation in Britain, as many place their hopes in either him or his next competitor, Tom Cavendish, to deliver a British win at Wimbeldon. Peter and Lizzie's relationship progresses, despite the disapproval of Lizzie's overprotective father-manager Dennis Bradbury, who believes it detrimental to her career. 

At a reception for the Wimbledon players at the London Eye, Lizzie is approached by an apparent old flame, arrogant American star and world number 1 Jake Hammond. Hammond deduces that Peter and Lizzie are seeing each other when Peter defends her. When Hammond insults Lizzie, Peter punches him and the couple run away to Peter's falt in Brighton. The next day, Dennis comes to Peter's flat and yells at him for spoiling his daughter's game. Lizzie overhears this and decides to leave him and focus on her game. The next day, Peter faces off against Tom Cavendish and beats him when Cavendish sprains his ankle, demonstrating his ability to go all the way.

The night before their semifinal matches, Peter sneaks into Lizzie's hotel room and persuades her to have sex. The next day, he performs above expectations  and wins in straight sets, but Lizzie loses. Lizzie angrily breaks up with Peter, claiming his selfishness made her lose, and decides to immediately return to the United States to train.

Peter has to play the final match against Jake Hammond. At the airport, Lizzie watches an interview on TV in which Peter apologizes and declares his love for her. She returns to Wimbledon.

As Lizzie reaches the stadium, Peter has lost two sets in the final and is behind in the third. When the game is suspended due to rain, Lizzie appears in the dressing room and forgives him. She tells him the secret of Jake's tricky serves and Peter fights back to win the title (3–6, 2–6, 6–4, 7–6(8-6), 6–4). Now a national hero in Britain, he and Lizzie get married. With his support, Lizzie goes on to win the U.S. Open and Wimbledon twice, ultimately achieving her dreams. In the last scene, Peter is with their younger child, a boy, watching Lizzie and their elder child, a girl, playing tennis on a neighborhood court in New York City.

Cast
 Paul Bettany as Peter Colt
 Kirsten Dunst as Lizzie Bradbury
 Sam Neill as Dennis Bradbury
 James McAvoy as Carl Colt
 Bernard Hill as Edward Colt
 Eleanor Bron as Augusta Colt
 Celia Imrie as Mrs Kenwood
 Nikolaj Coster-Waldau as Dieter Prohl
 Austin Nichols as Jake Hammond
 Jon Favreau as Ron Roth
 Jonathan Timmins as the Ballboy
 Robert Lindsay as Ian Frazier
 Martin Wimbush as Court Official
Cecilia Dazzi as Billi Clementi

Real tennis professionals on set
 Dominic Inglot as Paul Bettany's tennis double
 Vikas Punna as Ajay Bhatt
 Beti Sekulovski as Lizzie's first opponent
 Murphy Jensen as Ivan Dragomir
 Alun Jones as Tom Cavendish
 Rebecca Dandeniya as Arliyia Rupesinghe
 John McEnroe as himself/Commentator
 Chris Evert as herself/Commentator
 Mary Carillo as herself/Commentator
 John Barrett as himself/Commentator
 Pat Cash was the tennis adviser on set and trained the actors.

Production

Writing
The film is dedicated to Mark McCormack, founder of International Management Group, a management firm for high-level athletes, who died on 16 May 2003.

Casting
The film used locally recruited Wimbledon residents as extras for the crowd scenes.

Filming
The actors served with real tennis balls. All others were added digitally to make it appear like they were playing.

Locations

Some scenes were filmed during the 2003 championships between matches. It is the only time in the history of the tournament that this has been allowed. Some court scenes with Bettany were filmed at the Stoke Park Country Club, home of The Boodles Challenge. London Zoo's entrance was used for the entrance to Wimbledon. The beachfront scenes were filmed on location in Brighton.

Reception

Critical reception
Wimbledon received mixed reviews, with a 61% rating on Rotten Tomatoes, based on 145 reviews with an average rating of 5.87/10. The consensus reads, "A predictable, bland rom-com, but Bettany proves to be an appealing lead." It received "average" or "mixed" reviews from Metacritic, a 59 out of 100 based on reviews by 35 critics.

Stephen Holden of The New York Times wrote that Wimbledon was "much more conventional" than Loncraine's previous films but with "cleverer-than-average dialogue and sharply drawn subsidiary characters". Michael Charlotte's review for Empire gave the film three out of five stars, saying, "In tennis parlance, this fires off more moonballs to stay in play than outright winning shots. But Bettany is charming, and thankfully he and Dunst are appealing together".

Roger Ebert gave the film a positive review: "Wimbledon is a well-behaved movie about nice people who have good things happen to them. That's kind of startling, in a world where movie characters, especially in sports movies, occupy the edge of human experience. What a surprise to hear conversation instead of dialogue, and to realize that the villain may actually be right some of the time". He gave the film three out of four stars.

Box office
The film opened at number four, grossing US$7.1 million in its opening weekend at the North American box office.

Soundtrack
The film's digital soundtrack uses the "Surround EX" format. The song that plays in the trailer of the film is "Everlasting Love" by U2. The film features two songs by the Sugababes: "Caught in a Moment" and "Sometimes", both from the album Three.

References

External links
 
 
 

2004 films
2004 romantic comedy films
2000s sports comedy films
American romantic comedy films
American sports comedy films
British romantic comedy films
British sports comedy films
Wimbledon Championships
2000s English-language films
English-language French films
Films directed by Richard Loncraine
Films produced by Eric Fellner
Films produced by Tim Bevan
Films scored by Edward Shearmur
Films set in Brighton
Films set in London
Films shot at Shepperton Studios
Films shot in East Sussex
Films shot in London
Films shot in Monaco
French romantic comedy films
French sports comedy films
StudioCanal films
Tennis films
Universal Pictures films
Working Title Films films
2000s American films
2000s British films
2000s French films